Kali Charan Bahl is an associate professor emeritus in two departments: South Asian Languages and Civilizations and Linguistics at the University of Chicago. He specialized in Hindi and related languages or dialects.

Bahl has published more than half a dozen books, in both Hindi and English, about the grammar, semantics, and dialectology of Hindi. He also did research in the 1960s on Korwa, a Munda language.

Upon retirement, he made a large donation of his personal collection of books and documents to Regenstein Library.

Works
 Norman H. Zide, Colin P. Masica, Kalicharan Bahl and Anoop C. Chandola, Editors. A Premchand Reader. Honolulu: East-West Center Press. 1962.
 1963.  Korwa Vocabulary.  Mimeo., Chicago.
 Reference grammar of Hindi (a study of some selected topics in Hindi grammar, 1967
 On the present state of modern Rajasthani grammar, Rājasthānī Sódha Saṃsthāna, 1972
 Ādhunika Rājasthānī kā saṃracanātmaka vyākaraṇa, Rājasthānī Śodha Saṃsthāna, 1980
 Studies in the semantic structure of Hindi: synonymous nouns and adjectives with karana, Motilal Banarsidass, 1974
 Study in the transformational analysis of the Hindi verb, 196u.
 The concept of person as a relational category in Modern Standard Hindi and interpersonal speech-behavior on the parts of its partakers, University of Chicago, 2007.

References

20th-century Indian linguists
University of Chicago faculty
Year of birth missing (living people)
Living people